The Rural Municipality of Prince Albert No. 461 is a rural municipality (RM) in the Canadian province of Saskatchewan within Census Division No. 15 and  Division No. 5. The RM lies between the North Saskatchewan River and the South Saskatchewan River, and is located south of Prince Albert.

History 
The RM of Prince Albert No. 461 incorporated as a rural municipality on December 9, 1912.

Geography

Communities and localities 
The following urban municipalities are surrounded by the RM.

Cities
 Prince Albert

The following unincorporated communities are within the RM.

Localities
 Birson
 Cecil
 Clouston
 Cudworth Junction
 Davis
 Fir Ridge
 Halcro
 Holmes
 Red Deer Hill
 Stanleyville

Demographics 

Attractions 
 Sturgeon River Provincial Recreation Site
 Diefenbaker House
 St. Louis Ghost Train
 South Branch House
 Cecil Ferry
 Fenton Ferry
 Weldon Ferry

Government 
The RM of Prince Albert No. 461 is governed by an elected municipal council and an appointed administrator that meets on the second Thursday of every month. The reeve of the RM is Eric Schmalz while its administrator is Roxanne Roy. The RM's office is located in Prince Albert.

Transportation 
 Saskatchewan Highway 20
 Saskatchewan Highway 773
 Saskatchewan Highway 777
 St. Louis Bridge
 Cecil Ferry
 Fenton Ferry
 Weldon Ferry
 Prince Albert Airport
 CTRW Railway

See also 
List of rural municipalities in Saskatchewan

References

External links 

P
Division No. 15, Saskatchewan